The 2012 ASB Chatham Cup is New Zealand's 85th knockout football competition. 

The 2012 competition has a preliminary round, a qualification round, and four rounds proper before quarter-finals, semi-finals, and a final. Competition is run in three regions (northern, central, southern) until the quarter-finals, from which stage the draw is open. In all, 124 teams entered the competition.

The 2012 final
Won 6-1 by Central United over Lower Hutt City

Results

Second round

*Won on penalties by Eastern Suburbs (6–5)

Third round

Fourth round

* Won on penalties by Manukau City (4-3)

Quarter-finals

Semi-finals

Final

References

 NZ Football 2012 Chatham Cup full results

Chatham Cup
Chatham Cup
Chatham Cup
Chat